The 1997 Faber Grand Prix was a women's tennis tournament played on indoor carpet courts in Hannover, Germany that was part of Tier II of the 1997 WTA Tour. It was the 5th edition of the tournament and was held from 17 February until 23 February 1997. Third-seeded Iva Majoli won the singles title.

Finals

Singles

 Iva Majoli defeated  Jana Novotná 4–6, 7–6(7–2), 6–4
 It was Majoli's 1st title of the year and the 5th of her career.

Doubles

 Nicole Arendt /  Manon Bollegraf defeated  Larisa Savchenko /  Brenda Schultz-McCarthy 4–6, 6–3, 7–6(7–4)
 It was Arendt's 1st title of the year and the 10th of her career. It was Bollegraf's 2nd title of the year and the 25th of her career.

References

External links
 ITF tournament edition details
 Tournament draws

Faber Grand Prix
Faber Grand Prix
1997 in German women's sport
Faber